This is a list of the episodes of Mad, an animated sketch comedy television series inspired by Mad Magazine that aired on Cartoon Network.

Series overview

Episodes

Season 1 (2010–11)

Season 2 (2011–12)

Season 3 (2012–13)

Season 4 (2013)

References

External links
 

Lists of American children's animated television series episodes
Lists of American comedy television series episodes